Nasla Tower (نسلہ ٹاور) was an seventeen storey building located on Shahrah-e-Faisal, Karachi. In the encroachment case pending in the Supreme Court of Pakistan, the Supreme Court has ordered immediate demolition of Nasla Tower, a residential project in Plot No. 193 Sindhi Muslim Housing Society at the confluence of Shahra-e-Qaedin and Shahra-e-Faisal.

The protest
The 44 residents refused to vacate the flat, blaming the government for allowing the illegal project to go ahead, now that they already own all the legal documentation.

References

Towers in Karachi
Skyscrapers in Karachi
Former skyscrapers
Residential buildings in Pakistan
Skyscrapers in Sindh